John James Capozzi, Jr. (born 1956) is an American politician who served as Shadow U.S. Representative for the District of Columbia between 1995 and 1997 and was a member of the District of Columbia Democratic State Committee for 17 years.

Political career 
Prior to his election as Shadow U.S. Representative of the District of Columbia, Capozzi was involved in organizing protests in front of the Rayburn House office building in support of DC Statehood. He met with a number of Congresspersons prior to the 1993 vote for DC Statehood, the only vote of its kind to be held by the House of Representatives.

As the Shadow Representative, Capozzi worked with the Reverend Garyland Ellis Hagler and Council member William Lightfoot in pointing out Fannie Mae, then the largest private sector company in DC, was exempt from paying DC corporate income taxes. As a shareholder in the company, Capozzi sponsored a s shareholder's initiative to have the company make a payment, in lieu of taxes, to DC.

Rather than run for reelection in 1996, Capozzi ran as in the race to become an at-large councilmember on the Council of the District of Columbia and was defeated September 10, 1996.

In 2002, at Capozzi's initiative, the DC Council debated a proposal to change the District's flag in protest of DC's lack of voting rights in Congress. The new design would have added the letters "D.C." to the center start and the words "Taxation without Representation" in white on the upper and lower bars, the format already used on District licence plates. The change, presumably, would have been temporary and revoked once the city achieved equal representation or statehood. Capozzi's proposal was passed by the council by a 10–2 vote, but the final design was never adopted.

In 2012, Capozzi was among the candidates selected to replace at-large councilman Phil Mendelson. Mendelson resigned his council seat after incumbent Council Chairman Kwame Brown resigned because of legal troubles. In a vote on December 10 by the District of Columbia Democratic State Committee, Capozzi placed third out of three candidates behind winner Anita Bonds and Doug Sloan.

Electoral history

Environmental advocacy

Green Home in Hillcrest 

In August 2009 Capozzi made headlines in a local publication, East of the River. The former shadow Rep was highlighted by reporter, Gerri Williams in an article called 'A Green Home in Hillcrest'. Capozzi and his wife Sue built the first Green Home located in the South East region of Washington, D.C.

The solar concept was not new to Capozzi, who worked for the DC government's Office of the Chief
Technology Officer.

Green Power Advocacy

In 2010 Capozzi, as an active DC SUN member, filed a shareholder resolution with Pepco to force the company to reduce total greenhouse gas emissions from products and operations. He was quoted by a District of Columbia advocacy group, The Fight Back, as saying, "If they were making more money through solar then maybe they would have had more capacity to do a better job with reliability."

Personal life
He previously worked for BRMi Consulting as a Recruitment Manager. Currently, Capozzi works for the Office of the Chief Technology Officer of the District of Columbia as a Project Manager.

See also
 Shadow congressperson
 Political party strength in Washington, D.C.

References

1956 births
Living people
Washington, D.C., Democrats
United States shadow representatives from the District of Columbia
People from Montville, New Jersey